Crawley is a large town and borough in West Sussex, England.

The area has been inhabited since the Stone Age, and was a centre of ironworking in Roman times. Crawley developed slowly as a market town from the 13th century, serving the surrounding villages in the Weald. Its location on the main road from London to Brighton brought passing trade, which encouraged the development of coaching inns. A rail link to London opened in 1841.

Gatwick Airport, nowadays one of Britain's busiest international airports, opened on the edge of the town in the 1940s, encouraging commercial and industrial growth. After the Second World War, the British Government planned to move large numbers of people and jobs out of London and into new towns around South East England. The New Towns Act 1946 designated Crawley as the site of one of these. A master plan was developed for the establishment of new residential, commercial, industrial and civic areas, and rapid development greatly increased the size and population of the town over a few decades.

The town contains 14 residential neighbourhoods radiating out from the core of the old market town, and separated by main roads and railway lines. The nearby communities of Ifield, Pound Hill and Three Bridges were absorbed into the new town at various stages in its development. In 2009, expansion was being planned in the west and north-west of the town, in cooperation with Horsham District Council, which has now become a new neighbourhood named Kilnwood Vale, but it is not in Crawley. Economically, the town has developed into the main centre of industry and employment between London and the south coast. Its large industrial area supports manufacturing and service companies, many of them connected with the airport. The commercial and retail sectors continue to expand.

History

Origins
The area may have been settled during the Mesolithic period: locally manufactured flints of the Horsham Culture type have been found to the southwest of the town. Tools and burial mounds from the Neolithic period, and burial mounds and a sword from the Bronze Age, have also been discovered. Crawley is on the western edge of the High Weald, which produced iron for more than 2,000 years from the Iron Age onwards. Goffs Park—now a recreational area in the south of the town—was the site of two late Iron Age furnaces. Ironworking and mineral extraction continued throughout Roman times, particularly in the Broadfield area where many furnaces were built.

In the 5th century, Saxon settlers named the area Crow's Leah—meaning a crow-infested clearing, or Crow's Wood. This name evolved over time, and the present spelling appeared by the early 14th century. By this time, nearby settlements were more established: the Saxon church at Worth, for example, dates from between 950 and 1050 AD.

Although Crawley itself is not mentioned in the Domesday Book of 1086, the nearby settlements of Ifield and Worth are recorded. The first written record of Crawley dates from 1202, when a licence was issued by King John for a weekly market on Wednesdays. Crawley grew slowly in importance over the next few centuries, but was boosted in the 18th century by the construction of the turnpike road between London and Brighton. When this was completed in 1770, travel between the newly fashionable seaside resort and London became safer and quicker, and Crawley (located approximately halfway between the two) prospered as a coaching halt.  By 1839 it offered almost an hourly service to both destinations. The George, a timber-framed house dating from the 15th century, expanded to become a large coaching inn, taking over adjacent buildings. Eventually an annexe had to be built in the middle of the wide High Street; this survived until the 1930s. The original building has become the George Hotel, with conference facilities and 84 bedrooms; it retains many period features including an iron fireback.

Crawley's oldest church is St John the Baptist's, between the High Street and the Broadway. It is said to have 13th-century origins, but there has been much rebuilding (especially in the 19th century) and the oldest part remaining is the south wall of the nave, which is believed to be 14th century. The church has a 15th-century tower (rebuilt in 1804) which originally contained four bells cast in 1724. Two were replaced by Thomas Lester of London in 1742; but in 1880 a new set of eight bells were cast and installed by the Croydon-based firm Gillett, Bland & Company.

Railway age and Victorian era

The Brighton Main Line was the first railway line to serve the Crawley area. A station was opened at Three Bridges (originally known as East Crawley) in the summer of 1841. Crawley railway station, at the southern end of the High Street, was built in 1848 when the Horsham branch was opened from Three Bridges to Horsham. A line was built eastwards from Three Bridges to East Grinstead in 1855. Three Bridges had become the hub of transport in the area by this stage: one-quarter of its population was employed in railway jobs by 1861 (mainly at the London, Brighton and South Coast Railway's railway works near the station). The Longley company—one of South East England's largest building firms in the late 19th century, responsible for buildings including Christ's Hospital school and King Edward VII Sanatorium in Midhurst—moved to a site next to Crawley station in 1881. In 1898 more than 700 people were employed at the site.

There was a major expansion in house building in the late 19th century. An area known as "New Town" (unrelated to the postwar developments) was created around the railway level crossing and down the Brighton Road; the West Green area, west of the High Street on the way to Ifield, was built up; and housing spread south of the Horsham line for the first time, into what is now Southgate. The population reached 4,433 in 1901, compared to 1,357 a century earlier. In 1891, a racecourse was opened on farmland at Gatwick. Built to replace a steeplechase course at Waddon near Croydon in Surrey, it was used for both steeplechase and flat racing, and held the Grand National during the years of the First World War. The course had its own railway station on the Brighton Main Line.

In the early 20th century, many of the large country estates in the area, with their mansions and associated grounds and outbuildings, were split up into smaller plots of land, attracting haphazard housing development and small farms. By the outbreak of the First World War in 1914 Crawley had grown into a small but prosperous town, serving a wide rural area and those passing through on the A23 London–Brighton road. Three-quarters of the population had piped water supplies, all businesses and homes had electricity, and piped gas and street lighting had been in place for 50 years. An airfield was opened in 1930 on land near the racecourse. This was a private concern until the Second World War when it was claimed by the Royal Air Force.

New Town
In May 1946, the New Towns Act of 1946 identified Crawley as a suitable location for a New Town; but it was not officially designated as such until . The  of land set aside for the new town were split across the county borders between East Sussex, West Sussex and Surrey. Architect Thomas Bennett was appointed chairman of Crawley Development Corporation. A court challenge to the designation order meant that plans were not officially confirmed until December 1947. By this time, an initial plan for the development of the area had been drawn up by Anthony Minoprio. This proposed filling in the gaps between the villages of Crawley, Ifield and Three Bridges. Bennett estimated that planning, designing and building the town, and increasing its population from the existing 9,500 to 40,000, would take 15 years.

Work began almost immediately to prepare for the expansion of the town. A full master plan was in place by 1949. This envisaged an increase in the population of the town to 50,000, residential properties in nine neighbourhoods radiating from the town centre, and a separate industrial area to the north. The neighbourhoods would consist mainly of three-bedroom family homes, with a number of smaller and larger properties. Each would be built around a centre with shops, a church, a public house, a primary school and a community centre. Secondary education was to be provided at campuses at Ifield Green, Three Bridges and Tilgate. Later, a fourth campus, in Southgate, was added to the plans.

At first, little development took place in the town centre, and residents relied on the shops and services in the existing high street. The earliest progress was in West Green, where new residents moved in during the late 1940s. In 1950 the town was visited by the then heir to the throne, Princess Elizabeth, when she officially opened the Manor Royal industrial area. Building work continued throughout the 1950s in West Green, Northgate and Three Bridges, and later in Langley Green, Pound Hill and Ifield. In 1956, land at "Tilgate East" was allocated for housing use, eventually becoming the new neighbourhood of Furnace Green.

Expectations of the eventual population of the town were revised upwards several times. The 1949 master plan had allowed for 50,000 people, but this was amended to 55,000 in 1956 after the Development Corporation had successfully resisted pressure from the Minister for Town and Country Planning to accommodate 60,000. Nevertheless, plans dated 1961 anticipated growth to 70,000 by 1980, and by 1969 consideration was given to an eventual expansion of up to 120,000.

Extended shopping facilities to the east of the existing high street were provided. The first stage to open was The Broadwalk in 1954, following by the opening of the Queen's Square development by Her Majesty The Queen in 1958. Crawley railway station was moved eastwards towards the new development.

By April 1960, when Thomas Bennett made his last presentation as chairman of the Development Corporation, the town's population had reached 51,700;  of the factory and other industrial space had been provided; 21,800 people were employed, nearly 60% of whom worked in manufacturing industries, and only seventy people were registered as unemployed. The corporation had built 10,254 houses, and private builders provided around 1,500 more. Tenants were by then permitted to buy their houses and 440 householders had chosen to do so by April 1960.

A new plan was put forward by West Sussex County Council in 1961. This proposed new neighbourhoods at Broadfield and Bewbush, both of which extended outside the administrative area of the then Urban District Council. Detailed plans were made for Broadfield in the late 1960s; by the early 1970s building work had begun. Further expansion at Bewbush was begun in 1974, although development there was slow. The two neighbourhoods were both larger than the original nine: together, their proposed population was 23,000. Work also took place in the area now known as Ifield West on the western fringes of the town.

By 1980, the council identified land at Maidenbower, south of the Pound Hill neighbourhood, as being suitable for another new neighbourhood, and work began in 1986. However, all of this development was undertaken privately, unlike the earlier neighbourhoods in which most of the housing was owned by the council.

In 1999, plans were announced to develop the 14th neighbourhood on land at Tinsley Green to the northeast of the town; this was given the go ahead in 2011 and is officially the town's 14th neighbourhood, named Forge Wood after the ancient woodland that is enclosed within the development. After a temporary halt to the proposals when a possible expansion at Gatwick Airport was announced, construction started in 2015. Forge Wood is to have a maximum of 1900 homes. Development of another neighbourhood began in 2012 on the western side of Crawley in the Horsham district, named Kilnwood Vale. A plan for a new railway station fell through.

Governance

Local government 

Crawley became a parish in the sixteenth century, having previously been a chapelry in the parish of Slaugham. When district and parish councils were established under the Local Government Act 1894, Crawley was given a parish council and included in the Horsham Rural District. The parish was significantly enlarged in 1933, when it absorbed the neighbouring parish of Ifield.

Following the designation as a New Town in 1947, the parish of Crawley was enlarged in 1953 to take in territory from the parishes of Slaugham and Worth. Three years later, on 1 April 1956, the parish of Crawley was made an urban district, making it independent from Horsham Rural District. The Local Government Act 1972 led to the district being reformed as a borough in April 1974, gaining a mayor for the first time. The new borough in 1974 also saw its boundaries enlarged, gaining other areas which had been included in the designated area of the New Town as well as the area north of the town including Gatwick Airport, which had previously been in Surrey.

The Urban District Council received its coat of arms from the College of Heralds in 1957. After the change to borough status a modified coat of arms, based on the original, was awarded in 1976 and presented to the council on 24 March 1977. It features a central cross on a shield, representing the town's location at the meeting point of North-South and East-West roads. The shield bears nine martlets representing both the county of Sussex and the new town's original nine neighbourhoods. Supporters, of an eagle and a winged lion, relate to the significance of the airport to the locality. The motto featured is I Grow and I Rejoice—a translation of a phrase from the Epistulae of Seneca the Younger. Despite a petition to save it, the old Crawley Town Hall, which was built in the 1960s, was demolished in 2020 and a new Crawley Town Hall is due to be completed in late 2022.

Initially, the district (and then borough) council worked with the Commission for New Towns on many aspects of development; but in 1978 many of the commission's assets, such as housing and parks, were surrendered to the council. The authority's boundaries were extended in 1983 to accommodate the Bewbush and Broadfield neighbourhoods.

The borough remains part of the local two-tier arrangements, with services shared with West Sussex County Council. The authority is divided into 13 wards, each of which is represented by two or three local councillors, forming a total council of 36 members. Most wards are coterminous with the borough's neighbourhoods, but three neighbourhoods are divided: Broadfield, Northgate, and Pound Hill into "Pound Hill North and Forge Wood" and "Pound Hill South and Worth". The council is elected in thirds.

As of the 2021 local elections, the council is run by Labour in coalition with the sole independent councillor, with seats held as follows:

United Kingdom government 
Crawley Borough is coterminous with the parliamentary constituency of Crawley. Henry Smith won the seat at the 2010 general election and was re-elected at the 2015, 2017 and 2019 general elections. Laura Moffatt, a member of the Labour Party, was the MP for Crawley from 1997 to 2010; she was the Parliamentary Private Secretary to the Secretary of State for Health, Alan Johnson. In the 2005 general election, the winning margin was the slimmest of any UK constituency: Moffatt won by just 37 votes.

Brook House and Tinsley House Immigration Removal Centres, operated by UK Visas and Immigration, are within the grounds of Gatwick Airport in Crawley.

Data from the Home Office's national identity database at Doncaster, South Yorkshire, was backed up to servers in Crawley for disaster recovery and business continuity purposes. The Identity Documents Bill 2010, proposed in May 2010 and passed in September 2010, authorised the destruction of all data stored for the identity card scheme brought about by the Identity Cards Act 2006.

Geography 
It is surrounded by towns including Horley, Redhill, Reigate, Oxted, Dorking, Horsham, Haywards Heath, Burgess Hill and East Grinstead. The borough of Crawley is bordered by the districts of Mid Sussex and Horsham in West Sussex as well as the districts of Mole Valley and Tandridge and the borough of Reigate and Banstead in Surrey.

Crawley lies in the Weald between the North and South Downs. Two beds of sedimentary rock meet beneath the town: the eastern neighbourhoods and the town centre lie largely on the sandstone Hastings Beds, while the rest of the town is based on Weald Clay. A geological fault running from east to west has left an area of Weald Clay (with a ridge of limestone) jutting into the Hastings Beds around Tilgate. The town has no major waterways, although a number of smaller brooks and streams are tributaries for the River Mole which rises near Gatwick Airport and flows northwards to the River Thames near Hampton Court Palace. There are several lakes at Tilgate Park and a mill pond at Ifield which was stopped to feed the Ifield Water Mill.

In 1822 Gideon Mantell, an amateur fossil collector and palaeontologist, discovered teeth, bones and other remains of what he described as "an animal of the lizard tribe of enormous magnitude", in Tilgate Forest on the edge of Crawley. He announced his discovery in an 1825 scientific paper, giving the creature the name Iguanodon. In 1832 he discovered and named the Hylaeosaurus genus of dinosaurs after finding a fossil in the same forest.

Climate 
Crawley lies within the Sussex Weald, an area of highly variable terrain so that many microclimates of frost hollows, sun traps and windswept hilltops will be encountered over a short distance. During calm, clear periods of weather this allows for some interesting temperature variations, although most of the time, when mobile westerly airstreams persist, the weather is typically Oceanic like the rest of the British Isles. Gatwick is the nearest weather station that publishes long-term averages that give an accurate description of the climate of the Crawley area, although more recently the Met Office has also published data for its nearby weather station at Charlwood. Both weather stations are about 3 miles north of Crawley town centre and at similar altitudes.

Generally, Crawley's inland and southerly position within the UK means temperatures in summer are amongst the highest in the British Isles, Charlwood recording 36.3C (97.3F) and Gatwick recording 36.4C (97.5F) on 19 July 2006, just 0.2C and 0.1C lower, respectively, than the UK monthly record for that day set at Wisley, 20 miles to the west. The overall maximum stands at 36.5C (97.7F) at Charlwood, set on 10 August 2003. The absolute record for Gatwick is the aforementioned 36.4C. Before this, the highest temperature recorded at Gatwick was 35.6C (96.1F), also in August 2003. The maximum temperature was 25.1C (77.2F) or higher on 15.9 days of the year on average (1971-00) and the warmest day will typically rise to 29.4C (84.9F).

The overall minimum for Gatwick Airport for the period from 1960 is −16.7C (1.9F), set in January 1963. More recently, Charlwood fell to −11.2C (11.8F) and Gatwick −11.1C (12.0F) on 20 December 2010. Typically the coldest night at Gatwick will fall to −8.9C (16.0F). Air frost is recorded on 58.2 nights at Gatwick (1971-00)

Sunshine totals in Crawley are higher than many inland areas due to its southerly location: Gatwick averaged 1,574 hours per year over 1961–90. No data is available for 1971 to 2000, but given increases at comparable sites nearby, annual averages are likely to be over 1,600 hours.

Snowfall is often heavier in the Sussex Weald than in many other low-lying parts of central and southern England due to the proximity of moisture-laden southerly tracking low-pressure systems bringing easterly winds and snow to areas from South London southwards. However, again due to the southerly location of the area, with warmer air from the nearby English Channel, the snow is often temporary as low-pressure systems track north bringing in milder air; areas immediately north of London tend to have less accumulation, but lying for a longer duration.

Rainfall is lower than the English average, but higher than many other areas of the South East. 1mm of rain or more falls on 116.7 days of the year.

Neighbourhoods and areas 

There are 14 residential neighbourhoods, each with a variety of housing types: terraced, semi-detached and detached houses, low-rise flats and bungalows. There are no residential tower blocks, apart from the 8-storey Milton Mount Flats at the North end of Pound Hill. Many houses have their own gardens and are set back from roads. The hub of each neighbourhood is a shopping parade, community centre and church, and each has a school and recreational open spaces as well. Crawley Development Corporation's intention was for neighbourhood shops to cater only to basic needs, and for the town centre to be used for most shopping requirements. The number of shop units provided in the neighbourhood parades reflected this: despite the master plan making provision for at least 20 shops in each neighbourhood, the number actually built ranged from 19 in the outlying Langley Green neighbourhood to just seven in West Green, close to the town centre.

Each of the 14 residential neighbourhoods is identified by a colour, which is shown on street name signs in a standard format throughout the town: below the street name, the neighbourhood name is shown in white text on a coloured background.

There are areas which are not defined as neighbourhoods but which are closely associated with Crawley:
 The Manor Royal industrial estate is in the north of the town. Although it is part of the Northgate ward, it is allocated a colour: its street name signs feature the word "Industrial" on a black background.
 Crawley's town centre is in the southernmost part of Northgate. Its street name signs do not follow the standard format of the neighbourhood signs but display only the street name.
 Gatwick Airport was built on the site of a manor house, Gatwick Manor, close to the village of Lowfield Heath. Most of the village was demolished when the airport expanded, but the Grade II*-listed St Michael and All Angels Church, remains. The site of Lowfield Heath village, now occupied by warehouses and light industrial units, is on the airport's southern boundary, between the perimeter road and the A23 close to Manor Royal.
 Worth was originally a village with its own civil parish, lying just beyond the eastern edge of the Crawley urban area and borough boundary; but the development of the Pound Hill and Maidenbower neighbourhoods has filled in the gaps, and the borough boundary has been extended to include the whole of the village. The civil parish of Worth remains, albeit reduced in size, as part of the Mid Sussex district.
 Tinsley Green, a hamlet in Worth parish, is now within the Forge Wood neighbourhood. Its houses, farms and public house, the Greyhound (at which the British and World Marbles Championship has been held annually since 1932), lie on or around an east–west minor road running from the main Balcombe–Horley road to the Manor Royal estate.
It has been wholly within the borough since 1990, when the borough and county boundary was moved eastwards to align exactly with the M23 motorway. Until then, its houses and farms straddled the boundary. Fernhill was the site of a fatal aeroplane crash in 1969: 50 people (including two residents) died when Ariana Afghan Airlines Flight 701 crashed into a house on Fernhill Road.

Demography 

At the census in 2011 the population of Crawley was recorded as 106,597. The 2001 census data showed that population then accounted for 13.2% of the population of the county of West Sussex. The growth in population of the new town—around 1,000% between 1951 and 2001—has outstripped that of most similar-sized settlements. For example, in the same period, the population of the neighbouring district of Horsham grew by just 99%.

Approximately 64.5% of the population is aged below 45, compared to 55% of the population of West Sussex. White British account for 84.5% of the population and 15.5% of people are from other ethnic backgrounds. People of Indian and Pakistani origin account for 4.5% and 3% of the population respectively. Many inhabitants of Crawley work locally at Gatwick Airport as either air or ground crew.

Many Chagossians expelled from the Chagos Archipelago in the Indian Ocean settled in Crawley in the 1960s and 1970s, and it was reported in 2016 that the town's Chagossian community numbered approximately 3,000 people. Crawley MP Henry Smith stated that Crawley "is home to perhaps the largest Chagossian population in the world".

The borough has a population density of around 22 persons per hectare (9 persons per acre), making it the second most densely populated district in West Sussex, after Worthing. The social mix is similar to the national norm: around 50% are in the ABC1 social category, although this varies by ward, with just 44% in Broadfield North compared to 75% in Maidenbower.

The proportion of people in the borough with higher education qualifications is lower than the national average. Around 14% have a qualification at level 4 or above, compared to 20% nationally.

Economy 

Crawley originally traded as a market town. The Development Corporation intended to develop it as a centre for manufacturing and light engineering, with an industrial zone. The rapid growth of Gatwick Airport provided opportunities for businesses in the aviation, transport, warehousing and distribution industries. The significance of the airport to local employment and enterprise was reflected by the formation of the Gatwick Diamond partnership. This venture, supported by local businesses, local government and SEEDA, South East England's Regional Development Agency, aims to maintain and improve the Crawley and Gatwick area's status as a region of national and international economic importance.

Since the Second World War, unemployment in Crawley has been low: the rate was 1.47% of the working-age population in 2003. During the boom of the 1980s the town boasted the lowest level of unemployment in the UK. Continuous growth and investment have made Crawley one of the most important business and employment centres in the South East England region.

In April 2020, the Centre for Cities thinktank identified Crawley as the place in Britain at the highest risk of widespread job losses due to the coronavirus' effect on the economy; classing 56% of jobs in the town as either vulnerable or very vulnerable of being furloughed or lost.

Manufacturing industry 
Crawley was already a modest industrial centre by the end of the Second World War. Building was an important trade: 800 people were employed by building and joinery firms, and two—Longley's and Cook's—were large enough to have their own factories. In 1949, 1,529 people worked in manufacturing: the main industries were light and precision engineering and aircraft repair. Many of the jobs in these industries were highly skilled.

Industrial development had to take place relatively soon after the new town was established because part of the Corporation's remit was to move people and jobs out of an overcrowded and war-damaged London. Industrial jobs were needed as well as houses and shops to create a balanced community where people could settle. The Development Corporation wanted the new town to support a large and mixed industrial base, with factories and other buildings based in a single zone rather than spread throughout the town. A  site in the northeastern part of the development area was chosen. Its advantages included flat land with no existing development; proximity to the London–Brighton railway line, the A23 and the planned M23; space for railway sidings (which were eventually built on a much smaller scale than envisaged); and an adjacent  site reserved for future expansion, on the other side of the railway line (again, not used for this purpose in the end). Princess Elizabeth (later Queen Elizabeth II) opened the first part of the industrial area on 25 January 1950; its main road was named Manor Royal, and this name eventually came to refer to the whole estate.

The Corporation stipulated that several manufacturing industries should be developed, rather than allowing one sector or firm to dominate. It did not seek to attract companies by offering financial or other incentives; instead, it set out to create the ideal conditions for industrial development to arise naturally, by providing large plots of land with room for expansion, allowing firms to build their own premises or rent ready-made buildings, and constructing a wide range of building types and sizes.

Despite the lack of direct incentives, many firms applied to move to the Manor Royal estate: it was considered such an attractive place to relocate to that the Development Corporation was able to choose between applicants to achieve the ideal mix of firms, and little advertising or promotion had to be undertaken. One year after Manor Royal was opened, eighteen firms were trading there, including four with more than 100 employees and one with more than 1,000. By 1964, businesses which had moved to the town since 1950 employed 16,000 people; the master plan had anticipated between 8,000 and 8,500. In 1978 there were 105 such firms, employing nearly 20,000 people.

Thales Group opened a new manufacturing and office complex in Crawley in 2009. The site consolidated manufacturing and offices in the Crawley area and the south-east of England.

Service industry and commerce 

While most of the jobs created in the new town's early years were in manufacturing, the tertiary sector developed strongly from the 1960s. The Manor Royal estate, with its space, proximity to Gatwick Airport and good transport links, attracted airport-related services such as logistics, catering, distribution and warehousing; and the corporation and private companies built offices throughout the town. Major schemes during that period included premises for the Westminster Bank British Caledonian and The Office of the Paymaster-General. The five-storey Overline House above the railway station, completed in 1968, is used by Crawley's NHS primary care trust and various other companies.

Companies headquartered in Crawley include Doosan Babcock Energy, WesternGeco, Virgin Atlantic, Virgin Atlantic's associated travel agency Virgin Holidays, William Reed Business Media, Dualit and the Office of the Paymaster-General. Danish company Novo Nordisk, which manufactures much of the world's insulin supply, has its UK headquarters at the Broadfield Business Park, and BDO Global has an office in Crawley. The UK headquarters of Nestlé is in the Manor Royal area of Crawley. In addition the registered offices of TUI UK and Thomson Airways are located in Crawley.

British Airways took over British Caledonian's former headquarters near the Manor Royal estate, renamed it "Astral Towers" and based its British Airways Holidays and Air Miles divisions there. Other companies formerly headquartered in Crawley include Astraeus Airlines, British United Airways, CityFlyer Express, CP Ships, First Choice Airways, GB Airways, Laker Airways, Tradewinds Airways, and Air Europe.

Crawley has numerous hotels, including The George Hotel, dated to 1615. It is reputedly haunted.

Shopping and retail 

Even before the new town was planned, Crawley was a retail centre for the surrounding area: there were 177 shops in the town in 1948, 99 of which were on the High Street. Early new town residents relied on these shopping facilities until the Corporation implemented the master plan's designs for a new shopping area on the mostly undeveloped land east of the High Street and north of the railway line. The Broadwalk and its 23 shops were built in 1954, followed by the Queen's Square complex and surrounding streets in the mid-1950s. Queen's Square, a pedestrianised plaza surrounded by large shops and linked to the High Street by The Broadwalk, was officially opened in 1958 by Queen Elizabeth II. The town centre was completed by 1960, by which time Crawley was already recognised as an important regional, rather than merely local, shopping centre.

In the 1960s and 1970s, large branches of Tesco, Sainsbury's and Marks & Spencer were opened (the Tesco superstore was the largest in Britain at the time). The shopping area was also expanded southeastwards from Queen's Square: although the original plans of 1975 were not implemented fully, several large shop units were built and a new pedestrianised link—The Martlets—was provided between Queen's Square and Haslett Avenue, the main road to Three Bridges. The remaining land between this area and the railway line was sold for private development by 1982; in 1992 a  shopping centre named County Mall and anchored by an Owen Owen department store was opened there. Its stores includes major retailers such as The Entertainer, Boots, WHSmith and Superdry as well as over 80 smaller outlets. The town's main bus station was redesigned, roads including the main A2220 Haslett Avenue were rerouted, and some buildings at the south end of The Martlets were demolished to accommodate the mall.

A regeneration strategy for the town centre, "Centre Vision 2000", was produced in 1993. Changes brought about by the scheme have included  of additional retail space in Queen's Square and The Martlets, and a mixed-use development at the southern end of the High Street on land formerly occupied by Robinson Road (which was demolished) and Spencers Road (shortened and severed at one end). An ASDA superstore, opened in September 2003, forms the centrepiece. Robinson Road, previously named Church Road, had been at the heart of the old Crawley: a century before its demolition, its buildings included two chapels, a school, a hospital and a post office.

Public services 

Policing in Crawley is provided by Sussex Police; the British Transport Police are responsible for the rail network. The borough is the police headquarters for the West Sussex division, and is itself divided into three areas for the purposes of neighbourhood policing: Crawley East, Crawley West, and Crawley Town Centre. A separate division covers Gatwick Airport. There is a police station in the town centre; it is open 24 hours a day, and the front desk is staffed for 16 hours each day except Christmas Day. Statutory emergency fire and rescue services are provided by the West Sussex Fire and Rescue Service which operates a fire station in the town centre. The South East Coast Ambulance Service is responsible for ambulance and paramedic services.

Crawley Hospital in West Green is operated by West Sussex Primary Care Trust. Some services are provided by the Surrey and Sussex Healthcare NHS Trust, including a 24-hour Urgent Treatment Centre for semi-life-threatening injuries. The Surrey and Sussex was judged as "weak" by the Healthcare Commission in 2008, however in 2015 both the hospital and the Surrey and Sussex Trust were rated good by the Care Quality Commission.

Thames Water is responsible for all waste water and sewerage provision. Residents in most parts of Crawley receive their drinking water from Southern Water; areas in the north of the town around Gatwick Airport are provided by Sutton & East Surrey Water; and South East Water supplies Maidenbower.

UK Power Networks is the distribution network operator responsible for electricity. Gas is supplied by Southern Gas Networks who own and manage the South East Local Distribution Zone.

The provision of public services was made in co-operation with the local authorities as the town grew in the 1950s and 1960s. They oversaw the opening of a fire station in 1958, the telephone exchange, police station and town centre health clinic in 1961 and an ambulance station in 1963. Plans for a new hospital on land at The Hawth were abandoned, however, and the existing hospital in West Green was redeveloped instead.

In December 2008, a new three-storey library was opened in new buildings at Southgate Avenue, replacing the considerably undersized establishment formerly at County Buildings.

The Civil Aviation Authority Regulation Safety Group is in the Aviation House in Gatwick Airport in Crawley.

Transport 
Crawley's early development as a market town was helped by its location on the London–Brighton turnpike. The area was joined to the railway network in the mid-19th century; and since the creation of the new town, there have been major road upgrades (including a motorway link), a guided bus transit system and the establishment of an airport which has become one of Britain's largest and busiest.

Road 

The London–Brighton turnpike ran through the centre of Crawley, forming the High Street and Station Road. When Britain's major roads were classified by the British government's Ministry of Transport between 1919 and 1923, it was given the number A23. It was bypassed by a new dual carriageway in 1938 (which forms the A23's current route through the town), and then later to the east side of the town by the M23 motorway, which was opened in 1975. This connects London's orbital motorway, the M25, to the A23 at Pease Pottage, at the southern edge of Crawley's built-up area. The original single-carriageway A23 became the A2219.

The M23 has junctions in the Crawley area at the A2011/A264 (Junction 10) and Maidenbower (area of Crawley) (Junction 10A). The end of the motorway at Pease Pottage is Junction 11. The A2011, another dual-carriageway, joins the A23 in West Green and provides a link, via the A2004, to the town centre. The A2220 follows the former route of the A264 through the town, linking the A23 directly to the A264 at Copthorne, from where it then runs to East Grinstead.

Rail 

The first railway line in the area was the Brighton Main Line, which opened as far as Haywards Heath on 12 July 1841 and reached Brighton on 21 September 1841. It ran through Three Bridges, which was then a small village east of Crawley, and a station was built to serve it.

A line to Horsham, now part of the Arun Valley Line, was opened on 14 February 1848. A station was provided next to Crawley High Street from that date. A new station was constructed slightly to the east, in conjunction with the Overline House commercial development, and replaced the original station which closed on 28 July 1968. The ticket office and Up (London-bound) platform waiting areas form the ground floor of the office building.

The urban area of Crawley is served by a total of three rail stations including Ifield railway station. Due to Crawley's expansion this station is now surrounded by the town's western areas. Opened as Lyons Crossing Halt on 1 June 1907 to serve the village of Ifield, it was soon renamed Ifield Halt, dropping the "Halt" suffix in 1930.

Regular train services run from Crawley, and also Ifield, to London Victoria and London Bridge stations, Gatwick Airport, East Croydon, Horsham, Bognor Regis, Chichester, Portsmouth and Southampton. Three Bridges has direct Thameslink trains to Bedford and Brighton.

Bus and Fastway 

Crawley was one of several towns where the boundaries of Southdown Motor Services and London Transport bus services met. In 1958 the companies reached an agreement which allowed them both to provide services in all parts of the town. When the National Bus Company was formed in 1969, its London Country Bus Services subsidiary took responsibility for many routes, including Green Line Coaches cross-London services which operated to distant destinations such as Watford, Luton and Amersham. A coach station was opened by Southdown in 1931 on the A23 at County Oak, near Lowfield Heath: it was a regular stopping point for express coaches between London and towns on the Sussex coast. This traffic started to serve Gatwick when the airport began to grow, however.  When the National Bus Company was broken up, local services were provided by the new South West division of London Country Bus Services, which later became part of the Arriva group. Metrobus acquired these routes from Arriva in March 2001, and is now Crawley's main operator. It provides local services between the neighbourhoods and town centre, and longer-distance routes to Horsham, Redhill, Tunbridge Wells, Worthing and Brighton.

In September 2003 a guided bus service, Fastway, began operating between Bewbush and Gatwick Airport. A second route, from Broadfield to the Langshott area of Horley, north of Gatwick Airport, was added on 27 August 2005.

Gatwick Airport 

Gatwick Airport was licensed as a private airfield in August 1930. It was used during the Second World War as an RAF base, and returned to civil use in 1946. There were proposals to close the airport in the late 1940s, but in 1950 the government announced that it was to be developed as London's second airport. It was closed between 1956 and 1958 for rebuilding. Her Majesty The Queen reopened it on 9 June 1958. A second terminal, the North Terminal, was built in 1988.
An agreement exists between BAA and West Sussex County Council preventing the building of a second runway before 2019. Nevertheless, consultations were launched in 2002 by the Department for Transport, at which proposals for additional facilities and runways were considered. It was agreed that there would be no further expansion at Gatwick unless it became impossible to meet growth targets at London Heathrow Airport within existing pollution limits.

Sport and leisure 

Crawley Town F.C. is Crawley's main football team. Formed in 1896, it moved in 1949 to a ground at Town Mead adjacent to the West Green playing fields. Demand for land near the town centre led to the club moving in 1997 to the new Broadfield Stadium, now owned by the borough council. As of the 2019/2020 season, Crawley Town play in League Two, the fourth tier of league football in England. Perhaps the pinnacle of the club's history was in February 2011 when they played against Manchester United at Old Trafford in the fifth round of the F.A. Cup, a match which saw 9,000 Crawley fans make the trip to Manchester; the game was lost 1–0. The women's football club, Crawley Wasps F.C., plays in the FA Women's National League South, the third tier of women's football. It formed a parnership with Crawley Town in 2021. Three other local men's teams play in the Sussex County Football League: Three Bridges F.C., Oakwood F.C. and Ifield Galaxy F.C.. Crawley Rugby Club is based in Ifield, and a golf course was constructed in 1982 at Tilgate Park. Crawley Hockey Club plays their home matches at Hazelwick School, Three Bridges. Three Bridges Cricket Club is a founding member of the Sussex Cricket League and in 2018 were promoted back to the Premier Division.

The new town's original leisure centre was in Haslett Avenue in the Three Bridges neighbourhood. Building work started in the early 1960s, and a large swimming pool opened in 1964. The site was extended to include an athletics arena by 1967, and an additional large sports hall was opened by the town mayor, Councillor Ben Clay and Prime Minister Harold Wilson in 1974. However, the facilities became insufficient for the growing town, even though an annexe was opened in Bewbush in 1984. Athlete Zola Budd had been asked to take part in a 1,500-metre race as part of the opening celebrations, but her invitation was withdrawn at short notice because of concerns raised by council members about possible "political connotations and anti-apartheid demonstrators".

In 2005, Crawley Leisure Centre was closed and replaced by a new facility, the K2 Leisure Centre, on the campus of Thomas Bennett Community College near the Broadfield Stadium. Opened to the public on 14 November 2005, and officially by Lord Coe on 24 January 2006, the centre includes the only Olympic-sized swimming pool in South East England. In March 2008 the centre was named as a training site for the 2012 Olympics in London.

Crawley Development Corporation made little provision for the arts in the plans for the new town, and a proposed arts venue in the town centre was never built. Neighbourhood community centres and the Tilgate Forest Recreational Centre were used for some cultural activities, but it was not until 1988 that the town had a dedicated theatre and arts venue, at the Hawth Theatre. (The name derives from a local corruption of the word "heath", which came to refer specifically to the expanse of wooded land, south of the town centre, in which the theatre was built.) Crawley's earliest cinema, the Imperial Picture House on Brighton Road, lasted from 1909 until the 1940s; the Embassy Cinema on the High Street (opened in 1938) replaced it. A large Cineworld cinema has since opened in the Crawley Leisure Park, which itself also includes ten-pin bowling, various restaurants and bars and a fitness centre. The Moka nightclub on Station Way opened in October 2012.

Each neighbourhood has self-contained recreational areas, and there are other larger parks throughout the town. The Memorial Gardens, on the eastern side of Queen's Square, feature art displays, children's play areas and lawns, and a plaque commemorating those who died in two Second World War bombing incidents in 1943 and 1944. Tilgate Park and Nature Centre has walled gardens, lakes, large areas of woodland with footpaths and bridleways, a golfing area and a collection of animals and birds.

Heritage 

Crawley Museum is based in the town centre. Stone Age and Bronze Age remains discovered in the area are on display, as well as more recent artefacts including parts of Vine Cottage, an old timber-framed building on the High Street which was once home to former Punch editor Mark Lemon and which was demolished when the ASDA development was built.

Crawley has three Grade I listed buildings (the parish church of St Margaret in Ifield, the parish church of St Nicholas, Worth, and the Friends Meeting House in Langley Lane, Ifield), 12 Grade II* listed buildings and 85 Grade II listed buildings.  The borough council has also awarded locally listed building status to 58 buildings.

The high street becomes an annual focus of motoring heritage in November as one of the official stops on the London to Brighton Veteran Car Run.

Education 

Maintained primary and secondary schools were reorganised in 2004 following the Local Education Authority's decision to change the town's three-tier system of first, middle and secondary schools to a more standard primary/secondary divide. Since the restructuring, Crawley has had 17 primary schools (including two Church of England and two Roman Catholic) and four pairs of infant and junior Schools. Most of these were opened in 2004; others changed their status at this date (for example, from a middle to a junior school). Secondary education is provided at one of six secondary schools:
 Ifield Community College
 Hazelwick School
 Holy Trinity Church of England School
 Oriel High School
 St Wilfrid's Catholic School
 Thomas Bennett Community College
All six of these have a sixth form, the newest opening at Oriel High in September 2008.

There is also a primary / secondary School called The Gatwick School, which is a Free School that opened in 2014. It currently has 4 years, R, 1, 7 and 8. The schools at Ifield and Thomas Bennett are also bases for the Local Authority's adult education programmes.
Pupils with special needs are educated at the two special schools in the town, each of which covers the full spectrum of needs: Manor Green Primary School and Manor Green College.

Desmond Anderson, based in Tilgate converted to Academy status in February 2017 and is now part of the University of Brighton Academies Trust. The Atelier 21 Future School for up to 120 pupils aged 4 to 14 years, based in Broadfield House, opened on 24 August 2020.

Further education is provided by Central Sussex College. Opened in 1958 as Crawley Technical College, it merged with other local colleges to form the new institute in August 2005. The college also provides higher education courses in partnership with the universities at Chichester and Sussex. In 2004, a proposal was made for an additional campus of the University of Sussex to be created in Crawley, but as of 2008 no conclusion has been reached.

Media 
Crawley has three local newspapers, of which two have a long history in the area. The Crawley Observer began life in 1881 as Simmins Weekly Advertiser, became the Sussex & Surrey Courier and then the Crawley and District Observer, and took its current name in 1983. The newspaper is now owned by Johnston Press. The Crawley News was first published in 1979, and later took over the operations of the older Crawley Advertiser which closed in 1982. The newspaper was taken over by the Trinity Mirror group in 2015 as part of the purchase of Local World but its last edition was published on 26 October 2016. In September 2008 Johnston Press launched a new weekly broadsheet newspaper called the Crawley Times based on the companies paper produced in Horsham, the West Sussex County Times.

Crawley is served by the London regional versions of BBC and ITV television from the Crystal Palace or Reigate transmitters—although, the town is also served by BBC South East & ITV Meridian on Freesat. This means the town is served by news and television programmes from London and Tunbridge Wells.
 

Radio Mercury began broadcasting on 20 October 1984 from Broadfield House in Broadfield. The station, now owned by Global Radio, broadcasts as Heart South from Brighton, with the studios in Kelvin Way in Crawley closed in August 2010. On 1 February 2011, the local Gold transmitter on 1521 AM closed and listeners were advised to retune to 1548 AM (Gold London) or 1323 AM (Gold Sussex). Local BBC radio was provided by BBC Radio Sussex from 1983; this became part of BBC Southern Counties Radio following a merger with BBC Radio Surrey in 1994. From March 2009, BBC Southern Counties Radio became BBC Sussex on 104.5FM & BBC Surrey on 104FM. Due to the positioning of their transmitters, when broadcasting separately both stations cover Crawley stories.

Twin town 
 Eisenhüttenstadt, German Democratic Republic, 1963–1968 
 Dorsten, Germany, since 1973
, Alytus

Notable people and music groups

Akala (Kingslee James McLean Daley), British rapper voted the Best Hip Hop Act at the MOBO Awards 2006 
Sir Charles Court, the 21st Premier of Western Australia, was born in Crawley, but migrated to Australia with his family before his first birthday.
Erin Doherty, actress, known for roles in Call the Midwife (2017), Les Misérables (2018) as Princess Anne in The Crown (2019), Chloe (2022) 
Ms. Dynamite (Niomi Arleen McLean-Daley, MBE), British rapper, singer, songwriter, record producer, recipient of the Mercury Music Prize and 2 Brit Awards.
John George Haigh, the "Acid Bath Murderer", carried out some of his murders at a workshop in the West Green area.
Caroline Haslett, electrical pioneer, engineer and champion of women's rights.
Leadley (Bethan Mary Leadley), singer-songwriter, music television presenter for 4Music and youtuber.
Mark Lemon, first editor of Punch, lived on the High Street from 1858 until his death in 1870. Commemorated by a blue plaque outside the George Hotel.
Jordan Maguire-Drew, professional footballer for Grimsby Town, born in Crawley and played for Oakwood F.C. before joining Brighton and Hove Albion.
Alan Minter, boxer won bronze at the 1972 Munich Olympic Games at light middleweight and in 1980 became the undisputed world middleweight champion.
Ross Minter, boxer was British Boxing Board of Control English Welterweight boxing champion 2005.
Laura Moffatt, British Labour Party politician who was the Member of Parliament (MP) for Crawley from 1997 until 2010.
Kevin Muscat, a footballer who has played for Australia since 1994 and had a nine-year spell in Britain, playing for four different clubs, was born in the town.
Natasha Pyne, actress, known for The Taming of the Shrew (1967), The Breaking of Bumbo (1970) and Father, Dear Father (1973). 
Romesh Ranganathan, comedian and television personality, was a maths teacher at Hazelwick School and lives in the town.
Grace Saif, actress, known for Doctors (2000) and the Netflix show 13 Reasons Why. 
Gareth Southgate OBE, England manager (from 2016), former England football player, attended Pound Hill Junior School and Hazelwick School.
Daley Thompson CBE, athlete, winner of 2 Decathlon Olympic gold medals, trained in Crawley for the Olympics in 1980 and 1984.
Theresa Tomlinson (born 1946), writer for children and young adults, was born in Crawley. 
Peter Vaughan, actor, Straw Dogs (1971), Grouty in Porridge (1979) and Maester Aemon Targaryen in Game of Thrones (2011–2015). 
Dan Walker, BBC breakfast presenter, former sports presenter, born and raised in Crawley.
The Cure were formed in Crawley in 1976 by Robert Smith, Michael Dempsey and Lol Tolhurst, all of whom attended St Wilfrid's RC School.
The Feeling's drummer Paul Stewart, guitarist Kevin Jeremiah and keyboard player Ciaran Jeremiah were also at St Wilfrid's.
Brett Marvin and the Thunderbolts were formed in Crawley in 1968 at the Thomas Bennett School.
2-D, fictional musician, lead vocalist and keyboardist of Gorillaz

See also 

 List of places of worship in Crawley
 Urban planning
 West Sussex
 Worth Church
 City Place Gatwick

References

Bibliography

External links 

 Crawley Borough Council

 
Towns in West Sussex
New towns in England
Non-metropolitan districts of West Sussex
Populated places established in the 5th century
New towns started in the 1940s
Unparished areas in West Sussex
Boroughs in England